Adolph Green (December 2, 1914 – October 23, 2002) was an American lyricist and playwright who, with long-time collaborator Betty Comden, penned the screenplays and songs for some of the most beloved film musicals, particularly as part of Arthur Freed's production unit at Metro Goldwyn Mayer, during the genre's heyday. Many people thought the pair were married, but in fact they were not a romantic couple at all. Nevertheless, they shared a unique comic genius and sophisticated wit that enabled them to forge a six-decade-long partnership that produced some of Hollywood and Broadway's greatest hits.

Biography

Green was born in the Bronx to Hungarian Jewish immigrants Helen (née Weiss) and Daniel Green. He was the youngest of three sons and had two older brothers, Louis (circa 1907-?) and William (circa 1910-?). After high school, he worked as a runner on Wall Street while he tried to make it as an actor. He met Comden through mutual friends in 1938 while she was studying drama at New York University. They formed a troupe called the Revuers, which performed at the Village Vanguard, a club in Greenwich Village. Among the members of the company was a young comedian named Judy Tuvim, who later changed her name to Judy Holliday, and Green's good friend, a young musician named Leonard Bernstein, whom he had met in 1937 at Camp Onota (a summer camp in Pittsfield MA where Bernstein was the music counselor), frequently accompanied them on the piano. The act's success earned them a movie offer and the Revuers traveled west in hopes of finding fame in Greenwich Village, a 1944 movie starring Carmen Miranda and Don Ameche, but their roles were so small they barely were noticed, and they quickly returned to New York.

Their first Broadway effort teamed them with Bernstein for On the Town, a musical romp about three sailors on leave in New York City that was an expansion of a ballet entitled Fancy Free on which Bernstein had been working with choreographer Jerome Robbins. Comden and Green wrote the lyrics and book, which included sizeable parts for themselves. Their next two musicals, Billion Dollar Baby (1945) and Bonanza Bound (1947) were not successful, and once again they headed to California, where they immediately found work at MGM.

They wrote the screenplay for Good News, starring June Allyson and Peter Lawford, The Barkleys of Broadway for Ginger Rogers and Fred Astaire, and then adapted On the Town for Frank Sinatra and Gene Kelly, scrapping much of Bernstein's music at the request of Arthur Freed, who did not care for the Bernstein score.

They reunited with Kelly for their most successful project, the classic Singin' in the Rain, about Hollywood in the final days of the silent film era. Considered by many film historians to be the best movie musical of all time, it ranked No. 10 on the list of the 100 best American movies of the 20th century compiled by the American Film Institute in 1998. They followed this with another hit, The Band Wagon, in which the characters of Lester and Lily, a husband-and-wife team that writes the play for the show-within-a-show, were patterned after themselves. They were Oscar-nominated twice, for their screenplays for The Band Wagon and It's Always Fair Weather, both of which earned them a Screen Writers Guild Award, as did On the Town.

Their stage work during the next few years included the revue Two on the Aisle, starring Bert Lahr and Dolores Gray, Wonderful Town, an adaptation of the comedy hit My Sister Eileen, with Rosalind Russell and Edie Adams as two sisters from Ohio trying to make it in the Big Apple, and Bells Are Ringing, which reunited them with Judy Holliday as an operator at a telephone answering service. The score, including the standards "Just in Time", "Long Before I Knew You," and "The Party's Over" proved to be one of their richest.

In 1958, they appeared on Broadway in A Party with Betty Comden and Adolph Green, a revue that included some of their early sketches. It was a critical and commercial success, and they brought an updated version back to Broadway in 1977.

Among their other credits are the Mary Martin version of Peter Pan for both Broadway and television, a streamlined Die Fledermaus for the Metropolitan Opera, and stage musicals for Carol Burnett, Leslie Uggams, and Lauren Bacall, among others. Their many collaborators included Garson Kanin, Cy Coleman, Jule Styne, and André Previn.

The team was not without its failures. In 1982, A Doll's Life, an exploration of what Nora did after she abandoned her husband in Henrik Ibsen's A Doll's House, ran for only five performances, although they received Tony Award nominations for its book and score.

In 1980, Green was inducted into the Songwriters Hall of Fame. And, in 1981, he was inducted into the American Theatre Hall of Fame.

In 1989 he appeared as Dr. Pangloss in Bernstein's Candide.

Comden and Green received Kennedy Center Honors in 1991.

His Broadway memorial, with Lauren Bacall, Kevin Kline, Joel Grey, Kristin Chenoweth, Arthur Laurents, Peter Stone, and Betty Comden in attendance was held at the Shubert Theater on December 4, 2002.

Personal life
Green was married to actress Allyn Ann McLerie from 1945 to 1953.

Green's third wife was actress Phyllis Newman, who had understudied Holliday in Bells Are Ringing. They married in 1960, and remained so until Green's death in 2002. The couple had two children, Adam and Amanda, both of whom are songwriters.

Broadway credits
 On the Town (1944)
 Billion Dollar Baby (1945)
 Two on the Aisle (1951)
 Wonderful Town (1953)
 Peter Pan (1954)
 Bells Are Ringing (1956)
 Say, Darling (1958)
 A Party with Betty Comden and Adolph Green (1958)
 Do Re Mi (1960)
 Subways Are for Sleeping (1961)
 Fade Out – Fade In (1964)
 Hallelujah, Baby! (1967)
 Applause (1970)
 Lorelei (1974)
 On the Twentieth Century (1978)
 The Madwoman of Central Park West (1979)
 A Doll's Life (1982)
 Singin' in the Rain (1985)
 The Will Rogers Follies (1991)

Film credits 
 Good News (1947)
 The Barkleys of Broadway (1949)
 On the Town (1949)
 Singin' in the Rain (1952)
 The Band Wagon (1953)
 It's Always Fair Weather (1955)
 Auntie Mame (1958)
 Bells Are Ringing (1960)
 What a Way to Go! (1964)
 My Favorite Year (1982)

Acting credits
 Greenwich Village (1944) as Revuer (uncredited)
 Simon (1980) as Commune Leader
 My Favorite Year (1982) as Leo Silver
 Lily in Love (1984) as Jerry Silber
 Garbo Talks (1984) as himself
 I Want to Go Home (1989) as Joey Wellman
 Candide (1991, TV Movie) as Dr. Pangloss / Martin
 Frasier (1994, TV Series) as Walter (voice)
 The Substance of Fire (1996) as Mr. Musselblatt (final film role)

Awards and nominations

Notes

References
 Off Stage, a memoir by Betty Comden published in 1995

External links

 
 
 
 Adolph Green papers, 1944–2002, held by the Billy Rose Theatre Division, New York Public Library for the Performing Arts
 Comden and Green papers, 1933–2003, held by the Billy Rose Theatre Division, New York Public Library for the Performing Arts
 New York Public Library Blog on Comden and Green's Unproduced Screenplay Wonderland

1914 births
2002 deaths
People from the Bronx
American musical theatre librettists
American musical theatre lyricists
Broadway composers and lyricists
American people of Hungarian-Jewish descent
Grammy Award winners
Jewish American musicians
Jewish American songwriters
Kennedy Center honorees
Tony Award winners
20th-century American dramatists and playwrights
20th-century American musicians
Songwriters from New York (state)
20th-century American Jews
21st-century American Jews